The 1945 Rose Bowl was the 31st edition of the college football bowl game, played at the Rose Bowl in Pasadena, California, on Monday, January 1. The USC Trojans of the Pacific Coast Conference (PCC) defeated the Tennessee Volunteers of the Southeastern Conference (SEC), 25–0.

Game summary
The game was highlighted by a John Ferraro blocked punt, which was carried by Jim Callanan for a touchdown in the opening minutes of the game. Ferraro went on to become the president of the Los Angeles City Council.

Scoring

First quarter
USC – Jim Callanan, 30-yard run (West kick missed)

Second quarter
USC – Paul Salata, 22-yard pass from Hardy (West kick missed)

Third quarter
No scoring

Fourth quarter
USC – Jim Hardy, 9-yard run (West kick good)
USC – Doug MacLachlan, 49-yard pass from Hardy (West kick missed)

References

Rose Bowl
Rose Bowl Game
Tennessee Volunteers football bowl games
USC Trojans football bowl games
Rose Bowl
January 1945 sports events in the United States